Padu Kody is a village in Mangalore taluka, Karnataka, India. Its population is in relation considered small.  

Villages in Dakshina Kannada district